Henrique Henriques (also known as Anrique Anriquez) (1520–1600) was a Portuguese Jesuit priest and missionary who spent most of his life in missionary activities in South India. After his initial years in Goa he moved to Tamil Nadu where he mastered Tamil and wrote several books including a dictionary. He is considered to be the first European Tamil scholar.

He strongly believed that books of religious doctrines should be in local languages and to this end he wrote books in Tamil. His efforts made Tamil the first non-European language to be printed in moveable type. Hence he is sometimes called The Father of the Tamil Press. After his death his mortal remains were buried in Our Lady of Snows Basilica in Tuticorin, India.

Early life
Henriques was born in 1520 in Vila Viçosa, Portugal. He joined the Franciscan order but had to leave as he was of Jewish ancestry. He later studied Canon Law at the University of Coimbra until 1545. He entered the newly founded Society of Jesus on 7 October 1545, in Coimbra (Portugal) and departed for India in 1546.

Missionary in India
Henriques initially lived in Goa until 1557 and then moved to the Pearl Fishery Coast or Tuticorin, under orders of St. Francis Xavier, where he worked as a missionary from 1547 to 1549. In 1549, after the death of Antonio Criminali, he was elected superior of this mission, a post which he held until 1576. His progress in the development of the community and his concerns about the problems in the mission are explicit from the regular reports he wrote to his Superior General.

Printing in India

Henriques strongly felt that the mission could only be successful through the use of local languages. To this end he arranged for the printing of books on Christian doctrine in Tamil. Apart from being the first to produce a Tamil-Portuguese Dictionary, he set up the first Tamil press and printed books in Tamil script. The first such book printed in Tamil script was Thambiran Vanakkam (தம்பிரான் வணக்கம்) (1578), a 16-page translation of the Portuguese "Doctrina Christam", printed at Quilon(Kollam). It was followed by Kirisithiyaani Vanakkam (கிரிசித்தியானி வணக்கம்)(1579). These were works of catechism, containing the basic prayers of Catholicism. Before this 'Cartilha', a Tamil prayer book printed using Latin script, was printed in Lisbon by command of the Portuguese king and financed by the Paravars of Tuticorin who also helped with scholarly assistance.

He also printed Flos Sanctorum in Tamil (1586). This book contains the lives of Saints. By his efforts, Tamil became the first non-European language to be printed on a printing press. Hence, he is sometimes referred to as Father of the Tamil press

Henriques is the first known European Tamil scholar. Some of his works in the Malabar (Malauar) language (that is, Tamil) are no longer extant, including a work on grammar, a dictionary, a booklet for confession and a religious history from the Creation to the Ascension.

Death
Henriques died at Punnaikayal, Tamil Nadu on 22 February 1600. According to The Jesuit Annual Letter for 1601 

His mortal remains were buried in Our Lady of Snows Basilica in Tuticorin, Tamil Nadu.

See also

 Printing in Goa
 Printing in Tamil language
 Statue of Our Lady of Miracles, Jaffna patao

Notes

References

1520 births
People from Vila Viçosa
1600 deaths
16th-century Portuguese Jesuits
16th-century Indian Jesuits
University of Coimbra alumni
Roman Catholic missionaries in India
Tamil scholars of non-Tamil background
Portuguese Roman Catholic missionaries
Jesuit missionaries
Missionary linguists